Cathedral Rock is a natural sandstone butte on the Sedona skyline and one of the most-photographed sights in Arizona, United States.

The Cathedral Rock trail (USFS Trail #170) is a popular short, steep ascent from the Back O' Beyond trailhead to the saddle points or "gaps" in Cathedral Rock.

Geologically, Cathedral Rock is carved from the Permian Schnebly Hill formation, a redbed sandstone formed from coastal sand dunes near the shoreline of the ancient Pedregosa Sea. Ripple marks are prominent along the lower Cathedral Rock trail, and a black basalt dike may be seen in the first saddle.

Cathedral Rock was called "Court House Rock" on some early maps, and Courthouse Butte was called "Church House Rock", which has caused endless confusion ever since.

See also
 Bell Rock

References

External links

 "Cathedral Rock Trail". Coconino National Forest.
 

Sedona, Arizona
Buttes of Arizona
Rock formations of Arizona
Landforms of Yavapai County, Arizona
Protected areas of Yavapai County, Arizona